Van der Vegt  is a Dutch toponymic surname meaning "from/of the (river) Vecht". For most families, "Vecht" refers to the Overijsselse Vecht. At least one family is known to be named after the Utrechtse Vecht. Among variants are Van der Vecht and Van de(r) Vegte. People with the surname include:

Anna van der Vegt (1903–1983), Dutch gymnast
Henry van der Vegt (born 1972), Dutch footballer
Jacobus van der Vecht (1906–1992), Dutch entomologist
Jos van der Vegt (born 1953), Dutch businessman
Rebecca van der Vegt (born 1964), New Zealand women's soccer player

References

Dutch-language surnames
Dutch toponymic surnames